The Armenian diaspora population in Mexico is very small in comparison with other immigrant groups. The majority of the population arrived in Mexico between 1910–1928, most of them arriving after the Armenian genocide of 1915.

History

The earliest known record, from 1632, recorded the arrival to Mexico of an Armenian national by the name of Francisco Martín. In 1723, Armenian national Don Pedro de Zárate arrived to Mexico on a Spanish galleon from China to Acapulco. In 1897, Mexican President Porfirio Díaz planned a project to establish an agricultural community with Armenian settlers in Soto la Marina, Tamaulipas (in northern Mexico); the project, however, was never materialized. Soon after the Armenian genocide, committed by Ottoman forces in April 1915, many Armenians began to immigrate to the American continent. From 1921-1928, Mexico had an open immigration policy for most foreigners. During that time, close to 300 Armenians immigrated to Mexico.

Once in Mexico, most of the Armenian community decided to head north to the United States. The majority of those who stayed in the country, settled in La Merced neighborhood of Mexico City, where many started working as peddlers, shoemakers and shop owners. Due to its relatively small size (when compared to the larger communities in Canada and United States), the Armenian community in Mexico  never established a school or community center, which in turn did allow for the community to assimilate quickly into the larger Mexican population.

The Armenian community of Mexico today retains a number of approximately 400–500 people and an unknown number of descendants. Many members of the community have entered politics and are well known artists and actors; and have contributed to the ethnic composition of Mexico today.

Mexicans of Armenian ancestry

 Mauricio Ochmann
 Berge Bulbulian
 Rosa Gloria Chagoyán
 Jacobo Harrotian
 Siouzana Melikián
 Armen Ohanian
 Jacobo Harrotian
 Paris Pişmiş
 Arturo Sarukhán

See also
 Armenia–Mexico relations
 Armenian diaspora

References

Further reading

Mexico
Immigration to Mexico